A Woman in Flames (Die flambierte Frau, literally "The Flambéed Woman") is a German drama film from 1983, directed by Robert van Ackeren, starring Gudrun Landgrebe, Mathieu Carrière, and Hanns Zischler. The film was selected as the West German entry for the Best Foreign Language Film at the 56th Academy Awards, but was not accepted as a nominee.

Plot
Eva, an upper class housewife, becomes frustrated and leaves her arrogant husband. She is drawn to the idea of becoming a call girl. With the aid of a prostitute named Yvonne, Eva learns the basics and then they both set out looking for janes and johns together. She meets a charming man who she falls in love with and comes to his house late at night for a romantic tryst.  He turns out to be a gigolo.  Consequently, they move into his penthouse, which is large enough for both of them to offer their services separately.

Then slowly Eva enters the world of sado-masochism. She finds being a dominatrix extremely satisfying, and begins to take pleasure in controlling others and causing them intense pain. She discovers this in a scene in which a man is hiding under a table. Eva can see that his hands are sticking out from under the table and are clearly visible. Coldly, and with intense inner satisfaction, Eva proceeds to crush the man's hands by slowly walking over them with her stiletto-heeled boots.

Chris, the gigolo, becomes jealous of her and wants to know what's going on upstairs and how she is making so much money.  She tells him it is from hurting men, and that the more she hurts them, the more money she gets. This upsets him greatly. She also becomes jealous of his boyfriend/client, a man who has been coming to him for many years. The scenes in the upstairs room intensify.  One day he sneaks up and observes her in a scene dominating a man tied to a chair. He has a look on his face like "see, this is what you truly are," and the look on her face says proudly "yes, this is what I truly am." He tries to whisk her away from all of it, buying her furs, talking about marriage.  She tells him that she's been dreaming about hitting him, and in the dream he likes it.

The setting is all there for a romantic ending, and yet, he panics, he takes all their money and invests it in a restaurant that she doesn't want to be part of.  She tries to walk out on him, and he gets angry, throws her against the wall, hits her, pours alcohol on her, and lights her on fire.

But the last scene shows her unscathed, happy with her friend the sex worker/madame, and they're getting thrown out of a bar that Chris owns.

See also
 Sadism and masochism in fiction
 List of submissions to the 56th Academy Awards for Best Foreign Language Film
 List of German submissions for the Academy Award for Best Foreign Language Film

References

External links
 

1983 films
1983 drama films
German drama films
West German films
1980s German-language films
Films directed by Robert van Ackeren
BDSM in films
Films set in Berlin
Films about prostitution in Germany
1980s German films